H. Chuba Chang Nationalist Democratic Progressive Party politician from Nagaland. He has been elected in Nagaland Legislative Assembly election in 2021 by-election, 2008, 2003, 1998 and 1993 state assembly election from Noksen constituency. He won the 2021 by-election unopposed post death of C. M. Chang due to complications from COVID-19 pandemic.

References 

Living people
Nationalist Democratic Progressive Party politicians
Nagaland MLAs 2018–2023
People from Tuensang district
Year of birth missing (living people)